St. Joseph Church is a Roman Catholic church in the German Colony of Haifa, Israel. Administered by the Order of Carmelites, it is the main center of worship for the parish of Haifa within the Latin Patriarchate of Jerusalem. 

The first Latin Catholic church was dedicated to the Prophet Elijah in the Hamra Square. It was inaugurated in 1867 and could accommodate 400 worshipers. The structure was damaged in the 1948 Arab–Israeli War and the Carmelite friars relocated to a building of the Salesian school in the city center. In the 1950s the community managed to raise enough money to build a new church, designed by Italian architect Antonio Barluzzi, which was dedicated in 1961, a year after his death. The Church of St. Joseph is the last building designed by Barluzzi in the Holy Land.

See also
Catholic Church in Israel

References

Roman Catholic churches in Haifa
Roman Catholic churches completed in 1961
Religious organizations established in 1867
20th-century Roman Catholic church buildings in Israel
Carmelite churches